The women's 20 kilometres walk event at the 2020 Summer Olympics took place on 6 August 2021 in Sapporo. Approximately 60 athletes has qualified; the exact number depended on how many nations use universality places to enter athletes in addition to the number qualifying through time (one universality place was used in 2016). The actual number of participants was 58 walkers, and the winner was Antonella Palmisano of Italy.

Background

This was the 6th appearance of the event, having appeared at every Olympics since 2000.

Qualification

A National Olympic Committee (NOC) could enter up to 3 qualified athletes in the women's 20 kilometres walk if all athletes meet the entry standard or qualify by ranking during the qualifying period. (The limit of 3 has been in place since the 1930 Olympic Congress.) The qualifying standard was 1:31:00. This standard was "set for the sole purpose of qualifying athletes with exceptional performances unable to qualify through the IAAF World Rankings pathway." The world rankings, based on the average of the best five results for the athlete over the qualifying period and weighted by the importance of the meet, was then used to qualify athletes until the cap of 60 is reached.

The qualifying period was originally from 1 January 2019 to 31 May 2020. Due to the COVID-19 pandemic, the period was suspended from 6 April 2020 to 30 November 2020, with the end date extended to 29 June 2021. The most recent Area Championships was available to be counted in the ranking, even if not during the qualifying period. In July 2020, World Athletics announced that the suspension period would be lifted for the road events (marathons and race walks) on 1 September 2020.

NOCs were able to use also their universality place—each NOC can enter one female athlete regardless of time if they had no female athletes meeting the entry standard for an athletics event—in the 20 kilometres walk.

Women's 20 km walk

Competition format and course

The event consists of a single race.

Records

Prior to this competition, the existing world, Olympic, and area records were as follows.

Schedule

All times are Japan Standard Time (UTC+9)

The women's 20 kilometres walk took place on a single day.

Results

References

Women's 20 kilometres walk
Racewalking at the Olympics
Women's events at the 2020 Summer Olympics
Olympics